The 2017 OEC Taipei WTA Challenger is a professional tennis tournament to be played on indoor carpet courts. It will be the 10th edition of the tournament and part of the 2017 WTA 125K series, offering a total of $115,000 in prize money. It will take place in Taipei, Taiwan, on 13–19 November 2017.

Singles main draw entrants

Seeds 

 1 Rankings as of 6 November 2017.

Other entrants 
The following player received a wildcard into the singles main draw:
  Belinda Bencic
  Hsu Ching-wen
  Lee Ya-hsuan
  Zhang Ling

The following players received entry from the qualifying draw:
  Vitalia Diatchenko
  Priscilla Hon
  Dalila Jakupović
  Veronika Kudermetova

Doubles entrants

Seeds 

 1 Rankings as of 6 November 2017.

Other entrants 
The following pair received a wildcard into the doubles main draw:
  Chan Chin-wei /  Liang En-shuo

Champions

Singles

  Belinda Bencic def.  Arantxa Rus 7–6(7–3), 6–1

Doubles

  Veronika Kudermetova /  Aryna Sabalenka def.  Monique Adamczak /  Naomi Broady 2–6, 7–6(7–5), [10-6]

External links 
 Official website 

2017 WTA 125K series
Tennis tournaments in Taiwan
2017 in Taiwanese tennis
2017 in Taiwanese women's sport